Ijrahwa is a small village in  Siddharth Nagar district Uttar Pradesh, India. With a population of 500, the villagers are dependent on the local agricultural sector.

Villages in Siddharthnagar district